Huevos is the fifth studio album by the Arizona alternative rock band the Meat Puppets. It is said to have a strong ZZ Top influence in terms of style (ZZ Top also have titled some of their albums in Spanish, Tres Hombres, Tejas, Degüello and El Loco for instance). The album is named not only after the Spanish word for eggs, but is also a reference to the Southwestern expression "Huevos", meaning to deliver with chutzpah. Most of the songs were recorded in one take. The cover art is done by guitarist/vocalist Curt Kirkwood.

The 1999 Rykodisc re-release features 5 unreleased bonus tracks (early demos of "Sexy Music", "Paradise", "Fruit" and "Automatic Mojo" and a cover of Jimmy Reed's "Baby What You Want Me to Do") as well as live footage from a January 1988, concert at the Variety Arts Center in Los Angeles of "Automatic Mojo".

The Meat Puppets have been an influence on a number of bands, such as Nirvana, Soundgarden, Dinosaur Jr., Sebadoh, Pavement, Jawbreaker, and Sublime.

Content

Musical style 
In an AllMusic biography of the band, Stephen Thomas Erlewine described the sound of Huevos as "ZZ Top-style hard rock swagger". Matthew Smith Lahrman cataloged the record to be a blues rock effort.

Track listing
All songs written by Curt Kirkwood, unless otherwise noted.

Original album

 "Paradise" (Curt Kirkwood, Cris Kirkwood) – 5:00
 "Look at the Rain" – 4:20
 "Bad Love" (Curt Kirkwood, Cris Kirkwood) – 3:10
 "Sexy Music" – 5:28
 "Crazy" – 4:45
 "Fruit" – 3:30
 "Automatic Mojo" (Curt Kirkwood, Cris Kirkwood) – 3:19
 "Dry Rain" – 2:55
 "I Can't Be Counted On" (Curt Kirkwood, Cris Kirkwood) – 3:58

CD reissue bonus tracks

 "Baby What You Want Me to Do" (Jimmy Reed) – 1:29
 "Sexy Music" (Demo Version) – 6:40
 "Automatic Mojo"  (Demo Version) – 3:56
 "Paradise" (Demo Version) – 4:06
 "Fruit" (Demo Version) – 5:20

Personnel
Meat Puppets
Curt Kirkwood – guitar, vocals, cover
Cris Kirkwood – bass, vocals, illustration
Derrick Bostrom – drums

References

Meat Puppets albums
1987 albums
SST Records albums